Aranthangi railway station is a railway station serving the town of Aranthangi in Tamil Nadu, India.

Location
The railway station is located off the Aranthangi–Kattumavadi Rd of Mayiladthurai.

Lines
The station is a focal point of the historic main line Chennai–Rameswaram line. Because Karaikudi Jn to Thiruvarur Jn gauge conversion. Services start soon at next year completely or beginning of 2020. Now gauge conversion is completely between Karaikudi Jn to Pattukkottai Jn via Aranthangi station. Upon the latest news from Southern Railways and railway commissioner inspect the gauge line completely and train services start for passengers use in Feb last 2018.

References

External links
 

Trichy railway division
Railway stations in Pudukkottai district